Luciana Gimenez Morad (born November 3, 1969) is a Brazilian television host and former model. She became pregnant with Mick Jagger's child while he was unofficially married to super model Jerry Hall. DNA tests confirmed Lucas Maurice Morad-Jagger was Jagger's son.

Early life
Gimenez was born in São Paulo, daughter of businessman João Alberto Morad and actress Vera Gimenez. She is also the half sister of actor Marco Antonio Gimenez. Luciana spent part of her childhood at her maternal grandmother's house in São Paulo because of her parents' divorce proceedings. After the death of her grandmother, she moved to Rio de Janeiro, where she moved in with her mother and stepfather, actor Jece Valadão.

Career
Gimenez started her modeling career at age 13. She was then recruited at 16 by John Casablancas, founder of Elite Model Management and began modeling in many cities around the world, such as Paris, Hamburg, Milan and New York. After retiring from modeling, Gimenez went on to become a TV hostess on Brazil's RedeTV!, and her show is the primetime show Superpop. She has already been endorsed by brands such as: Chanel, Osklen, Marks & Spencer, Azzedine Alaïa.

After research done by ABC, Luciana was invited to participate in the program The View on June 10, 2013. One of the main issues addressed by the program was the campaign against the prevention of communicable disease by prostitutes.

Personal life
Her son with musician Mick Jagger, Lucas Maurice Morad, also known as Lucas Jagger, was born on May 18, 1999. She was married to Marcelo de Carvalho, who owns RedeTV!, from August 19, 2006, to 2018. Gimenez and Carvalho have one son.

She speaks four languages fluently: her native Portuguese, English, French and Italian.

Filmography

Television

Film

References

External links

Official website

1969 births
Living people
People from São Paulo
Brazilian people of Lebanese descent
Brazilian people of Spanish descent
Brazilian people of Portuguese descent
Brazilian television presenters
Brazilian female models
Brazilian film actresses
Brazilian Buddhists
Groupies
Brazilian women television presenters